In the mythological writings of William Blake, Utha is the second son of Urizen.

In Chapter VIII of The Book of Urizen, Utha's birth is briefly described:

[...] Utha,
From the waters emerging laments;

His identification is with the classical element Water, in the identification of Urizen's four sons.

Notes

William Blake's mythology